Christopher Rose or Chris Rose may refer to:

Sir Christopher Rose (judge) (born 1937), English Lord Justice of Appeal
Christopher Rose (electrical engineer) (born 1957), American electrical engineer and professor
Chris Rose (artist) (born 1959), British wildlife artist
Chris Rose (journalist) (born 1960), American journalist and writer
Chris Rose (born 1971), American television sportscaster

See also
Christine Rose (disambiguation)